"Nuketown" is a song by American rapper Ski Mask the Slump God, featuring vocals from fellow American rapper Juice WRLD. It was released as the second track off of Ski Mask the Slump God's debut studio album, Stokeley.
"Nuketown" was the first track that Juice WRLD and Ski Mask the Slump God had recorded in mid 2018; however, it was the only track that would be officially released during Higgins' lifetime. The track is very reminiscent of the loud aggressive tracks that Goulbourne used to release with the late XXXTentacion, with Juice WRLD paying homage to him on his verse on the track.

Critical reception
The song received positive reviews. Writing for Pitchfork, Trey Alston praised the production and Ski Mask the Slump God's cadence, saying "[Ski Mask the Slump God] deflects attention from a mid-tempo, bass-heavy beat and allocates it to his jittery cadence". Donna-Claire Chesman of DJbooth labelled the song "[a] dark [shout] of the SoundCloud era".

Music video
The official music video for "Nuketown" was released on October 25, 2019. Directed by Cole Bennett, the video sees Ski Mask the Slump God and Juice WRLD fighting enemies in a desert after their plane crashes. The video has over 60 million views as of June 2022.

Chart performance

The song also serves as Ski Mask the Slump God's most popular song (in the US Hot 100)

Certifications

References

Juice Wrld songs
2018 singles
2018 songs
Ski Mask the Slump God songs
Music videos directed by Cole Bennett
Songs written by Juice Wrld